Eberhard I, count of Bonngau and count in Zulpichgau and in Keldachgau (904 – 937), son of Erenfried I of Maasgau.

He left children:

Hermann I count in Auelgau (922/48), who had children: 
Eberhard II count in Auelgau (died 966), and 
Gottfried count in Auelgau (966/70).
Erenfried II count in Zülpichgau;
Dietrich, count in Drente and in Salland, count of Hamaland (died before 964). He married Amalrada van Hamaland.

Ezzonids
House of Limburg
House of Limburg-Stirum
Counts of Germany
937 deaths
Year of birth unknown